The Egmond Half Marathon is an annual half marathon race over 21.1 kilometres that has been staged in Egmond aan Zee, Netherlands since 1973. The competition normally takes place in early January. Sections of the road race cross along the beach and sand dunes of the village, situated on the North Sea coast. The 2010 edition of the race was cancelled due to poor weather conditions, marking the first break in the race's history.

In addition to the elite level races, the event features recreational fun runs for the public, including a team race for friends or colleagues. The first editions of the event attracted around 1000 runners – a number which increased to over 5000 runners by the mid-1980s. A record 10,370 participants competed in 2000 and the race continued to grow in popularity, attracting over 16,500 people for the 2009 edition. A quarter marathon is also held annually and starts several hours before the half marathon.

The event is organised by Le Champion – a Dutch running club which also organises the Dam tot Damloop and Zandvoort Circuit Run, among other races.

Winners 
Key:

See also
 Rotterdam Half Marathon

References

List of winners
 van Hemert, Wim (January 9, 2010). Egmond aan Zee Half Marathon. ARSS. Retrieved February 17, 2010.

External links
 Official website

Half marathons in the Netherlands
Recurring sporting events established in 1973